Zhang Bin (born May 16, 1974) is a mainland Chinese manhua artist and illustrator, who works under the pen name "Benjamin".  

Zhang has done variant covers for Marvel Comics and illustrations for the music video to J'aimerais tellement with French popstar Jena Lee and its album cover, Vous remercier.

Zhang generally works in digital painting using a pen with a graphics tablet and image editing software (e.g. Corel Painter).

Selected works

Comics 
 One Day (2002)
 Remember (2004)
 Orange (2006)
 Savior (2010)

One-shots and additional works
 Seven Swords (2007)
 Sky Doll Lacrima Christi #1 (Marvel, 2010)

 Covers 
 Comics covers 
 X-Men Origins: Emma Frost (Marvel, 2009)
 New Mutants #1-2, #4 (Marvel, 2009)

 Album covers 
 Vous remercier (2009), by Jena Lee

 Art Books 
 Io: Art of the Wired (2004)
 Flash (2008)

 Music Videos 
 J'aimerais tellement by Jena Lee (2009)
 Je me perds'' by Jena Lee (2009)

References

External links
Zhang's Blog
Zhang Bin at Xiao Pan
Zhang Bin at Comicvine
Zhang Bin at Lambiek

Interviews
Interview by About.com
Interview by Paul Gravett

Chinese comics artists
Living people
1974 births
Artists from Heilongjiang